The Cangallo Province is a province located in the Ayacucho Region of Peru. It is one of the eleven that make up the region. The province has a population of 36,977 inhabitants as of census 2005. 
The capital of the province is the city of Cangallo.

Boundaries
North: Huamanga Province
East: Vilcas Huamán Province
South: Víctor Fajardo Province
West: Huancavelica Region

Geography 
Other mountains are listed below:

Political division

Cangallo (Cangallo)
Chuschi (Chuschi)
Los Morochucos (Pampa Cangallo)
María Parado de Bellido (Pomabamba)
Paras (Paras)
Totos (Totos)

Ethnic groups 
The people in the province are mainly indigenous citizens of Quechua descent. Quechua is the language which the majority of the population (90.14%) learnt to speak in childhood, 9.62% of the residents started speaking using the Spanish language (2007 Peru Census).

Archaeology 
Various archaeological sites of the province were declared a National Cultural Heritage. Some of the most important sites of the province are listed below:

 Anta Q'asa, Apachita Achamarka, Apachita Awqanqa, Apachita Manchayniyuq, Kunkachayuq, Llaqta Punta, Marka, Ñawpa Llaqta,  Pirwaylla, Turichayuq, Wakuya, Waman Pukyu, Wantay Llamuqu, Waña Q'asa and Wichinka in the Paras District
 Añas Qullpa, Kullku Wasi, Pillwa Pampa and Pisqu Pata in the Totos District

See also 
 Yanaqucha

Sources

External links
  Portal de Cangallo
 Primera web de Cangallo

Provinces of the Ayacucho Region